Wawrowo  is a village in the administrative district of Gmina Lidzbark, within Działdowo County, Warmian-Masurian Voivodeship, in northern Poland.

The village has a population of 140.

References

Wawrowo